Pycnoclavella flava is a species of sea squirt found in New Caledonia.

References 

Ascidiacea
Animals described in 1988